The Shire of Williams is a local government area in the Wheatbelt region of Western Australia, about  southeast of the state capital, Perth.

History

The Williams Road District was created on 12 February 1871 as one of the first regional local government areas in Western Australia. On 1 July 1961 it became a shire following the enactment of the Local Government Act 1960, which reformed all road districts into shires.

Wards
Until 2002, the Shire was divided into 3 wards - North West (1), North East (1) and Central (3). On 3 May 2003 all wards were abolished and councillors sit at large.

Towns and localities
The towns and localities of the Shire of Williams with population and size figures based on the most recent Australian census:

Former towns
 Congelin

Population

Notable councillors
 Frederick Piesse, Williams Roads Board member 1880–1889, chairman 1886–1889; later a state MP

Heritage-listed places
As of 2023, 322 places are heritage-listed in the Shire of Williams, of which two are on the State Register of Heritage Places.

References

External links
 

Williams